Mikiola fagi, the beech gall midge is a gall-causing fly in the family Cecidomyiidae. This species was first described by Theodor Hartig in 1839.

Range 
According to observations of the species aggregated on GBIF, this fly spreads across Europe.

References 

Cecidomyiidae
Gall-inducing insects